Floral Park is an incorporated village in Nassau County, New York, United States, on Long Island. The population as of the US Census of 2010 is 15,863.

The Incorporated Village of Floral Park is at the western border of Nassau County, and is located mainly in the Town of Hempstead, while the section north of Jericho Turnpike is within the Town of North Hempstead. The area was formerly known as East Hinsdale.

The neighborhood of Floral Park in the New York City borough of Queens is adjacent to the village.

History
The area that is now Floral Park once marked the western edge of the great Hempstead Plains, and by some reports was initially known as Plainfield. Farms and tiny villages dominated the area through the 1870s when the development of the Long Island Rail Road Hempstead Branch and Jericho Turnpike cut through the area. Hinsdale had more than two dozen flower farms after the Civil War. The present-day village of Floral Park was once called East Hinsdale.

In 1874, John Lewis Childs arrived in the area to work for C.L. Allen as a seed seller. After building his own seed and bulb business and starting America's first seed catalog business, Childs bought a great deal of land in the area. To promote his own business and the local horticultural industry, Childs named the local streets after flowers and renamed the area Floral Park. The expansion of the Floral Park Post Office and nearby village businesses are attributed solely to the success of Childs' business. 

When the local Post Office took the name Floral Park, the Long Island Rail Road followed suit by changing the name of the East Hinsdale station to Floral Park in 1888. Formerly part of Queens, Floral Park became part of the new county of Nassau in 1899, and it was incorporated as a village in 1908. Childs served as its first president starting that year.

The massive volume of his mail order business grew the local post office to such an extent that it drew comparisons with the post offices of Chicago, Baltimore, and Boston.

Geography

The northern and western village boundaries are the border with New York City.

The village also shares borders with the Nassau County neighborhoods of Bellerose Village and Bellerose Terrace to the Northwest, New Hyde Park and Stewart Manor to the East, South Floral Park to the South, and Elmont to the Southwest.

Demographics

2010 census
As of the 2010 census, the population was 87% White, 81.6% Non-Hispanic White, 1.3% Black or African American, 0.1% Native American, 6.9% Asian, 0.0% Pacific Islander, 2.6% from other races, and 2% from two or more races. Hispanic or Latino of any race were 8.8% of the population.

2000 census
As of the census of 2000, there were 15,967 people, 5,770 households, and 4,258 families residing in the village. The population density was 11,635.9 people per square mile (4,499.9/km2). There were 5,892 housing units at an average density of 4,293.8 per square mile (1,660.5/km2). The racial makeup of the village was 93.56% White, 0.46% African American, 0.06% Native American, 3.88% Asian, 0.03% Pacific Islander, 1.03% from other races, and 0.98% from two or more races. Hispanic or Latino of any race were 5.38% of the population.

There were 5,770 households, out of which 34.0% had children under the age of 18 living with them, 60.9% were married couples living together, 9.9% had a female householder with no husband present, and 26.2% were non-families. 23.1% of all households were made up of individuals, and 11.6% had someone living alone who was 65 years of age or older. The average household size was 2.76 and the average family size was 3.30.

In the village, the population was spread out, with 24.5% under the age of 18, 6.4% from 18 to 24, 28.3% from 25 to 44, 25.3% from 45 to 64, and 15.6% who were 65 years of age or older. The median age was 40 years. For every 100 females, there were 89.3 males. For every 100 females age 18 and over, there were 85.4 males.

The median income for a household in the village was $113,719, and the median income for a family was $137,243. Males had a median income of $56,527 versus $38,592 for females. The per capita income for the village was $51,183. None of families or the population were below the poverty line, including none of those under age 18 and none of those age 65 or over.

The average and median sales prices of a home in the village as of 2011, were, respectively, $468,738 and $460,000.

Emergency services 
The Village of Floral Park has its own Police Department, which is made up of an Operations and Administration division. 

The Floral Park Police Department provides service to all residents within the boundaries of the Village of Floral Park. The Village also has a volunteer fire department, made up of three Engine Companies (Alert Engine Co. #1, Reliance Engine Co. #2, Active Engine Co. #3), a Hook & Ladder Company, and a Rescue (Emergency Medical Services) Company.

Education 

Two high schools are located in Floral Park: Floral Park Memorial High School and Sewanhaka High School, both of which are part of the Sewanhaka Central High School District (which also includes schools in nearby New Hyde Park, Franklin Square and Elmont.) 

There are three elementary schools in Floral Park. Two of them, John Lewis Childs School and Floral Park-Bellerose School, are part of the Floral Park-Bellerose School District (the latter school also serves the neighboring village of Bellerose and Bellerose Terrace). Our Lady of Victory Elementary School is operated by, the Roman Catholic, Our Lady of Victory parish.

Adjacent Queens neighborhood

The Queens neighborhood is adjacent to the Village of Floral Park, and uses the designation "North Floral Park" with a ZIP Code of 11004 and telephone area codes of 718, 347, and 917. North Floral Park also extends into the ZIP Code of 11001. The neighborhood is part of Queens Community Board 13. Floral Park is a middle-class neighborhood that consists mostly of Cape Cod–style houses. Most of the houses were built after World War II to accommodate returning soldiers. Veterans today make up 11 percent of all residents in Floral Park, versus six percent citywide.

Union Turnpike is the border between the neighborhoods, with Glen Oaks to the north. The other boundaries of Floral Park are roughly Little Neck Parkway and 252nd Street to the west, Langdale Street to the east, and a diagonal boundary from Hillside Avenue at 271st Street to Jericho Turnpike at 257th Street to the south. The neighborhood is in close proximity to the Cross Island Parkway and the Grand Central Parkway. MTA New York City Transit buses serve Floral Park on the  local routes and  express route. MTA Bus Company operates the  express buses, to Midtown Manhattan. The neighborhood is also served by Nassau Inter-County Express  bus. The Floral Park station, located in Nassau County proper, is the closest service on the Long Island Rail Road Hempstead Branch, which travels to Jamaica station and to Penn Station in Midtown Manhattan.

Notable people 
 Benedetto Aloi (1935-2011), consigliere of Colombo crime family, New York City mobster
 John Lewis Childs (1856-1921), founder
 Diana Diamond, newspaper editor
 William Diard, opera singer
 Steve Falteisek (born 1972), former Major League Baseball pitcher. Falteisek was drafted in the tenth round of the 1992 Major League Baseball Draft by the Montreal Expos
 Robert Mapplethorpe (1946-1989), photographer, born and raised on the Queens side.
 Pete Nice, hip-hop MC (born Peter J. Nash)
 Pete Richert (born 1939), former Major League Baseball pitcher
 Max Shachtman (1904-1972), associate of Leon Trotsky
 John Williams (born 1932), composer

References

External links 

 
 Floral Park Fire Department website
 Floral Park - Bellerose Schools
 Floral Park Historical Society
 Sewanhaka High School District
 Long Island Rail Road Online Museum--Floral Park/East Hinsdale
 Floral Park Police Department

 
Villages in Nassau County, New York
Neighborhoods in Queens, New York